is the name of multiple train stations in Japan.

 Takamatsu Station (Kagawa), a JR Shikoku station
 Takamatsu Station (Ishikawa), a JR West station
 Takamatsu Station (Tokyo), a Tama Monorail station